Deep learning anti-aliasing (DLAA) is a form of spatial anti-aliasing created by Nvidia. DLAA depends on and requires Tensor Cores available in Nvidia RTX cards.

DLAA is similar to deep learning super sampling (DLSS) in its anti-aliasing method, with one important differentiation being that DLSS's goal is to increase performance at the cost of image quality, where the main priority of DLAA is improving image quality at the cost of performance, irrelevant of resolution upscaling or downscaling. DLAA is similar to temporal anti-aliasing (TAA) in that they're both spatial anti-aliasing solutions relying on past frame data. Compared to TAA, DLAA is substantially better when it comes to shimmering, flickering, and handling small meshes like wires.

DLAA collects game rendering data such as raw low-resolution input, motion vectors, depth buffers, and exposure / brightness information. This Information is then used by DLAA to improve upon its anti-aliasing, with the aim of reducing temporal instability.

Differences between TAA and DLAA 
TAA is used in many modern video games and game engines, however all previous implementations have used some form of manually written heuristics to prevent temporal artifacts such as ghosting and flickering. One example of this is neighborhood clamping which forcefully prevents samples collected in previous frames from deviating too much compared to nearby pixels in newer frames. This helps to identify and fix many temporal artifacts, but deliberately removing fine details in this way is analogous to applying a blur filter, and thus the final image can appear blurry when using this method.

DLAA uses a convolutional auto-encoder neural network trained to identify and fix temporal artifacts, instead of manually programmed heuristics as mentioned above. Because of this, DLAA can generally resolve detail better than other TAA and TAAU implementations, while also removing most temporal artifacts.

Differences between DLSS and DLAA 
DLSS handles upscaling with a focus on performance, DLAA handles anti-aliasing with a focus on visual quality. DLAA runs at the given screen resolution with no upscaling or downscaling functionality.  

DLSS and DLAA share the same AI-driven anti-aliasing method. Both are made by Nvidia and require Tensor Cores.

See also 

 Spatial anti-aliasing
 Temporal anti-aliasing
 Anti-aliasing

References 

Anti-aliasing algorithms